Dr. Shin Sang-Ho (born 1947) is an internationally known Korean ceramicist whose works can be found in many museums around the world. He is the former Dean, College of Fine Arts at Hongik University in Seoul, South Korea.

Career
Many of the living great Korean ceramicists of today resulted from the South Korean government's program in the mid-20th century to rediscover the secrets of ancient Korean celadon ceramics from the Goryeo Dynasty, one of the pinnacles of Korean ceramic arts. After graduating from Hongik University in Seoul, Shin began his career by recreating this traditional blue-green celadon as well as buncheong. After a brief sojourn in London as a visiting professor at the Royal Academy of Art (1995–1997) where he was exposed particularly to African art, he returned to Korea with an abruptly different style from the traditional work of his early years, fusing both western and eastern design in his work. The "Dream" series (1995) was one of his first exhibits to gain international recognition, and fused traditional Asian vessel shapes and punch'ong glazes decorated with abstract patterns reminiscent of Asian calligraphy or ink wash paintings. Traveling extensively around the world his later pieces have become increasingly contemporary. His "Dream of Africa" series (2002) fused primitive animal art with modern minimalism.

Currently, Shin has been developing "fired painting" tiles used as a means to apply ceramic arts to commercial architecture. His fired painting tiles were used as the exterior surface to the Clayarch Gimhae Museum in South Korea, where he is currently their Director.

Selected collections
Shin's work is in the permanent collections of:

 The National Museum of Contemporary Art (South Korea)
 Museum of Korea University in Seoul (South Korea)
 Museum of Hong-Ik University in Seoul (South Korea)
 Ho-Am Art Museum in Yong-in (South Korea)
 World Ceramic Exposition Foundation, Icheon World Ceramic Center, Gyeonggi (South Korea)
 Museum of Modern Ceramic Art, Gifu (Japan)
 Everson Museum in Syracuse (United States)
 Victoria and Albert Museum in London (United Kingdom)
 The British Museum in London (Britain)
 Royal Ontario Museum in Ontario (Canada)
 Royal Museum of Mariemont in Brussels (Belgium)
 Cleveland Museum of Art in Cleveland (United States)
 Seattle Art Museum (United States)
 Sèvres - Cité de la céramique (national ceramics museum in Sèvres, France)
 Royal Collection Trust (Collection of Queen Elizabeth II, UK)

External links
 https://archive.today/20111003215320/http://www.clayarch.org/ex/expop2/eng_pro.vm
 http://www.sanghoshin.com
 https://web.archive.org/web/20090816171617/http://www.longhouse.org/exhibitions.ihtml?id=15
 http://www.clevelandart.org/Explore/artist.asp?searchText=shin+sang%2Dho&tab=1&recNo=0
 http://www.londonkoreanlinks.net/blog/2005/04/15/rediscovering-korean-ceramics/
 https://www.panoramio.com/photo/3402871
 http://www.loveedfinearts.com/bio_sangho.html
 http://www.artfacts.net/en/artist/sang-ho-shin-71811/profile.html

1947 births
Living people
Academic staff of Hongik University
South Korean ceramists
South Korean potters